William Gray Beyer was an American writer of science fiction and mystery.

Biography 
William Gray Beyer worked his way through the Drexel Institute by selling radio receivers.  He worked at many jobs including taxi driving, sales, railroading and police work.  He joined the Philadelphia police force in approximately 1941 to gain authentic background for his detective stories. He was active as a writer from 1939 to 1951 and his stories appeared in the pulp magazines of that period including Argosy.  His book, Minions of the Moon was published by Gnome Press in 1950.

Works

 Minions of the Moon (1939) [Mark Nevins Book 1]
 "Let 'Em Eat Space" (1939)
 Minions of Mars (1940) [Mark Nevins Book 2]
 Minions of Mercury (1940) [Mark Nevins Book 3]
 Minions of the Shadow (1941) [Mark Nevins Book 4]
 Eenie, Meenie, Minie — Murder! (1945)
 Murder Secretary (1945)
 Death of a Puppeteer (1946)
 Murder by Arrangement (1948)
 "The Deadly Thinkers" (1951)
 Minions of the Shadow : and the other Mark Nevin-Omega novels (omnibus, 2003)

References

Notes

External links

20th-century American novelists
20th-century American male writers
American male novelists
American mystery writers
American science fiction writers
American male short story writers
20th-century American short story writers